In mathematics, Property FA is a property of groups first defined by Jean-Pierre Serre.

A group G is said to have property FA if every action of G on a tree has a global fixed point.

Serre shows that if a group has property FA, then it cannot split as an amalgamated product or HNN extension; indeed, if G is contained in an amalgamated product then it is contained in one of the factors.  In particular, a finitely generated group with property FA has finite abelianization.

Property FA is equivalent for countable G  to the three properties: G is not an amalgamated product; G does not have Z as a quotient group; G is finitely generated.  For general groups G the third condition may be replaced by requiring that G not be the union of a strictly increasing sequence of subgroup.

Examples of groups with property FA include SL3(Z) and more generally G(Z) where G is a simply-connected simple Chevalley group of rank at least 2.  The group SL2(Z) is an exception, since it is isomorphic to the amalgamated product of the cyclic groups C4 and C6 along C2.

Any quotient group of a group with property FA has property FA.  If some subgroup of finite index in G has property FA then so does G, but the converse does not hold in general.  If N is a normal subgroup of G and both N and G/N have property FA, then so does G.

It is a theorem of Watatani that Kazhdan's property (T) implies property FA, but not conversely.  Indeed, any subgroup of finite index in a T-group has property FA.

Examples
The following groups have property FA:
 A finitely generated torsion group;
 SL3(Z);
 The Schwarz group  for integers A,B,C ≥ 2;
 SL2(R) where R is the ring of integers of an algebraic number field which is not Q or an imaginary quadratic field.

The following groups do not have property FA:
 SL2(Z);
 SL2(RD) where RD is the ring of integers of an imaginary quadratic field of discriminant not −3 or −4.

References
 
   English translation: 
 

Properties of groups
Trees (graph theory)